The Enola Gay is a USAAF B-29 Superfortress, that dropped Little Boy, the first atomic bomb used in warfare, on Hiroshima in Japan during WWII

Enola Gay may also refer to:

People
 Enola Gay Tibbets, namesake of the WWII nuclear bomber
 Enola Gay Gilmore, wife of U.S. basketball player Artis Gilmore

Fictional characters
 Enola Gay (fictional character), a character from the 1989 Martin Amis novel London Fields

Places
 Enola Gay Hangar, an aircraft hangar at Wendover Air Force Base, Utah, USA

Music
 Enola Gay (band), a band formerly signed to Century Media Records (see List of Century Media Records artists)

Songs
 "Enola Gay" (song), a 1980 anti-war song by Orchestral Manoeuvres in the Dark
 "Enola Gay" (2008 song), an anti-war song by Sugizo
 "Enola Gay" a song about the United States' WWII atomic bomb attacks on Japan by folksinger Utah Phillips

Other uses
 Enola Gay: The Men, the Mission, the Atomic Bomb (film), a 1980 telemovie about the dropping of the Little Boy atomic bomb on Hiroshima
 Enola Gay (book), a book by Gordon Thomas & Max Morgan Witts, that was condensed and republished in 1977 by Reader's Digest in the Reader's Digest Condensed Books
 Enola Gay (fictional bombers), the driving plot point of the 2006 film Yo-Yo Girl Cop
 Enola Gay (horse), a racehorse that set a speed record in winning the 2020 Appalachian Stakes

See also

 "Flight of the Enola Gay" (1990 song), a song by Blue Cheer off the album Highlights and Lowlives
 Bockscar, the B-29 that dropped the Fat Man atomic bomb onto Nagasaki in WWII
 Manhattan Project (disambiguation)
 Little Boy (disambiguation)
 Fat Man (disambiguation)
 Boxcar (disambiguation)
 
 Enola (disambiguation)
 Gay (disambiguation)